Cossus nina is a moth in the family Cossidae. It is found in Costa Rica.

References

Natural History Museum Lepidoptera generic names catalog

Cossus
Moths described in 1911
Moths of Central America